Carina Helen Boberg (12 May 1952 – 31 May 2020) was a Swedish actress, perhaps best known for her starring role in the TV4 comedy series Rena Rama Rolf as "Bettan" opposite Lasse Brandeby.

Boberg was born in Gothenburg, where she studied acting at the Gothenburg Theatre Academy. She was hired by Gothenburg City Theatre after her graduation in 1983, and was part of the permanent acting staff at that theatre from 1983 until 2019. She also made guest appearances on the stage at other Swedish theatres, including Dalateatern, Uppsala Stadsteater, and Östgötateatern.
 
Boberg was married to actor Göran Ragnerstam.

Filmography
1994–1998 – Rena rama Rolf (TV series)
1997 – Skallgång
1997 – Glappet (TV series)
2000 – Soldater i månsken (TV series)
2001 – Bekännelsen
2002 – Suxxess
2002 – Skeppsholmen (TV series)
2003 – Miffo
2003 – Kopps
2003 – En ö i havet (TV series)
2004 – Lokalreportern (TV series)

References

20th-century Swedish actresses
1952 births
2020 deaths
Actors from Gothenburg